The Fatal Glass of Beer (1933) is an American pre-Code short film starring W. C. Fields, produced by Mack Sennett, and released theatrically by Paramount Pictures.  Written by Fields and directed by Clyde Bruckman, the film is a parody of rugged stage melodramas set in the Yukon.

Plot
Ma and Pa Snavely live in a cabin in the Yukon. Many years before, their son Chester left for the big city and became involved in crime after "the fatal glass of beer".

Pa Snavely, as portrayed by Fields, serenades a Royal Canadian Mounted Police officer with "The Fatal Glass of Beer", a mournful song detailing the evils of foul drink and bad companions in the big city. A zither accompaniment recorded for the film seldom matches the vocal, because Fields subtly changes keys when the zither does not, resulting in a humorously off-key effect.

Son Chester returns home after getting out of prison, and promises his father not to tell his Mother what he really did. He makes the same promise to his Mother. When Pa and Ma learn that Chester threw the bonds away, and intends to live off their savings, Pa and Ma hurl him out of the house.

Fields emphasizes the stagey satire by striking various poses and being overly theatrical with the dialogue. The most famous gag has Fields opening the cabin door periodically and exclaiming, "And it ain't a fit night out for man or beast!", with some obviously fake snow thrown into his face a moment later. He would reprise that gag during the "play-within-the-play" in The Old Fashioned Way (1934).

Cast
 W. C. Fields as Pa Snavely
 Rosemary Theby as Ma Snavely
 George Chandler as Chester Snavely, their son
 Richard Cramer as Constable Posthlewhistle, Royal Canadian Mounted Police

Notes
 The Fatal Glass of Beer is one of three W. C. Fields short films that fell into the public domain after the copyright lapsed in the 1960s (the other two being The Dentist and The Golf Specialist). As such, these three films frequently appear on inexpensive video or DVD compilations.
 This sketch was originally a stage play and was not filmed until 1933. This is evidenced with a wanted poster of Fields in a Yukon prospector's outfit, as seen in The Golf Specialist.
 Clive James referenced the film in his television criticism column for The Observer, collected in The Crystal Bucket, criticising a 1978 British television production of Wuthering Heights (which he called "Wuthering Depths" and "The blithering pits") for its cheap production values.

References

External links
 
 
  Running time 18 minutes 27 seconds.

1933 films
Mack Sennett Comedies short films
1933 comedy films
American black-and-white films
Films directed by Mack Sennett
Films directed by Clyde Bruckman
Films with screenplays by W. C. Fields
Royal Canadian Mounted Police in fiction
American comedy short films
1930s English-language films
1930s American films